Gu Gyo-dong (born 3 September 1972) is a South Korean fencer. He competed in the team épée events at the 1992 Summer Olympics.

Results
In the 1992 Summer Olympic Games. Gu had a record of 0-0-2, competing against Jerri Bergström and Péter Vánky. Gu lost 1-5 in his bout with Bergström, and lost 3-5 in his bout with Vánky. In the 1994 and 2002 Asian Games, Gu competed for South Korea in the Team Épée event, earning a bronze medal. In the 2002 World Fencing Championships in Lisbon, Gu earned a bronze medal for South Korea in Team Épée.

References

1972 births
Living people
South Korean male épée fencers
Olympic fencers of South Korea
Fencers at the 1992 Summer Olympics
Asian Games medalists in fencing
Fencers at the 1994 Asian Games
Fencers at the 2002 Asian Games
Asian Games bronze medalists for South Korea
Medalists at the 1994 Asian Games
Medalists at the 2002 Asian Games